Guanine nucleotide exchange factor VAV2 is a protein that in humans is encoded by the VAV2 gene.

VAV2 is the second member of the VAV oncogene family. Unlike VAV1, which is expressed exclusively in hematopoietic cells, VAV2 transcripts were found in most tissues.

Interactions
VAV2 has been shown to interact with CD19 and Grb2.

References

Further reading

External links